The 2022 Pennzoil 150 at the Brickyard was the 20th stock car race of the 2022 NASCAR Xfinity Series, and the eleventh iteration of the event. The race was held on Saturday, July 30, 2022, in Speedway, Indiana at the Indianapolis Motor Speedway road course, a  permanent road course built inside the speedway. The race took the scheduled 62 laps to complete. A. J. Allmendinger, driving for Kaulig Racing, dominated the majority of the race, leading 42 laps, and earning his 14th career NASCAR Xfinity Series win, along with his third of the season. To fill out the podium, Alex Bowman, driving for Hendrick Motorsports, and Justin Allgaier, driving for JR Motorsports, would finish 2nd and 3rd, respectively.

Background 
The Indianapolis Motor Speedway, located in Speedway, Indiana, (an enclave suburb of Indianapolis) in the United States, is the home of the Indianapolis 500 and the Brickyard 400.

Constructed in 1909, it is the original speedway, the first racing facility so named. It has a permanent seating capacity estimated at 235,000 with infield seating raising capacity to an approximate 400,000. It is the highest-capacity sports venue in the world.

In addition to the Indianapolis 500, the speedway also hosts NASCAR's Verizon 200 and Pennzoil 150. From 2000 to 2007, the speedway hosted the Formula One United States Grand Prix, and from 2008 to 2015 the Moto GP.

Entry list

Practice 
The only 30-minute practice session was held on Friday, July 29, at 3:30 PM EST.

Qualifying 
Qualifying was held on Friday, July 29, at 4:00 PM EST. Since the road course version of Indianapolis Motor Speedway is a road course, the qualifying system used is a two group system, with two rounds. Drivers will be separated into two groups, Group A and Group B. Each driver will have a lap to set a time. The fastest 5 drivers from each group will advance to the final round. Drivers will also have one lap to set a time. The fastest driver to set a time in the round will win the pole.

Race results 
Stage 1 Laps: 20

Stage 2 Laps: 20

Stage 3 Laps: 22

Standings after the race 

Drivers' Championship standings

Note: Only the first 12 positions are included for the driver standings.

References 

2022 NASCAR Xfinity Series
NASCAR races at Indianapolis Motor Speedway
Pennzoil 150
2022 in sports in Indiana